Gebert is a surname. Notable people with the surname include:

Albert J. Gebert (1906–1980), football coach for the University of Wichita 1930–1941
Anna Gebert (born 1979), Finnish violinist from Poland
August Gebert German Socialist revolutionary
Bolesław Gebert (1895–1986), American Communist Party official, one of the organization's top Polish-language speaking leaders
Gordon Gebert (born 1941), child actor who is predominantly known for having smaller roles, in such films as Holiday Affair
Konstanty Gebert (born 1953), Polish journalist and a Jewish activist, war correspondents of Polish daily newspapers, son of Bolesław Gebert
Paul Gebert, Sr. (1870–1963), American politician and businessman

See also
Richard-Gebert-Sportanlage, the home of Austrian football club SK Schwadorf until the club merged with VfB Admira Wacker Mödling in 2008

Surnames from given names